Roman Road railway station was a railway station on the East Kent Light Railway. It opened in May 1925 and closed to passenger traffic on 1 November 1928. Today there is no trace of the station.

References

Sources
 

Disused railway stations in Kent
Former East Kent Light Railway stations
Railway stations in Great Britain opened in 1925
Railway stations in Great Britain closed in 1928